Eluvium is the moniker of the American ambient recording artist Matthew Cooper, who resides in Portland, Oregon. Cooper, who was born in Tennessee and raised in Louisville, Kentucky, before relocating to the Northwest, is known for blending various genres of experimental music including electronic, minimalism and drone. His albums often feature artwork and photographs by Jeannie Paske.

Eluvium is signed to the record label Temporary Residence Limited.

Matthew Robert Cooper and Miniatures
In April 2008, Cooper announced he would release a "solo album" under the name Matthew Robert Cooper. Writing on the Temporary Residence message boards, Cooper explained the change "this is not far from something "eluvium" would release—but since I began writing them—I felt that they were somehow disconnected from eluvium—perhaps a different personality took shape—thus, the use of a different name - this work is very dear to me."

Miniatures was issued in 2008 on a limited vinyl release on the fledgling Portland label, Gaarden Records. The album was limited to 2,000 copies with the first 1,000 on colored vinyl.

Other projects
Cooper has also teamed up with Charles Buckingham, with whom he has worked on the ambient video project titled Window Exchange, to produce the "unedited improvised basement minidisc recordings" of Concert Silence. In the fall of 2007, Concert Silence made 09.22.07 [2-3pm], a 51-minute, six part instrumental piece.

In April 2010, Infraction Records released "09.22.07 [2-3pm]" on limited edition vinyl and compact disc, alongside a new 12" E.P./CD titled "Rain Furniture".

Cooper scored fellow Portlander Matt McCormick's feature film debut Some Days Are Better Than Others, under Temporary Residence Ltd. One of Cooper's original pieces can be heard in the trailer of the film. Another film scored by Cooper is For Thousands of Miles (2013) by Mike Ambs.

Cooper has released an Eluvium 10" vinyl named "Pedals / Petals" in January 2013, for the Vinyl Films project by film director Cameron Crowe.

In January 2014, Pitchfork reported that Cooper and Mark T. Smith of Explosions in the Sky teamed up to form a new act called Inventions, who released their first album, a self-titled, on April 1 through Temporary Residence. In September 2016, he released the album False Readings On.

Discography

as Eluvium
Studio albums
 Lambent Material (2003, Temporary Residence Limited)
 An Accidental Memory in the Case of Death (2004, Temporary Residence Limited)
 Talk Amongst the Trees (2005, Temporary Residence Limited)
 Copia (2007, Temporary Residence Limited)
 Similes (2010, Temporary Residence Limited)
 Static Nocturne (2010, Watership Sounds)
 Nightmare Ending (2013, Temporary Residence Limited)
 False Readings On (2016, Temporary Residence Limited)
 Shuffle Drones (2017, Temporary Residence Limited)
 Pianoworks (2019, Temporary Residence Limited)
 Virga I (2020, Temporary Residence Limited)
Virga II (2021, Temporary Residence Limited)
(Whirring Marvels In) Consensus Reality (2023, Temporary Residence Limited)

Singles, EPs and splits
 Travels in Constants Vol. 20 (2005, Temporary Residence Limited)
 When I Live by the Garden and the Sea (2006, Temporary Residence Limited)
 Jesu/Eluvium split (2007, Temporary Residence Limited)
 Leaves Eclipse the Light (2010, Temporary Residence Limited)
 The Motion Makes Me Last (2010, Temporary Residence Limited)
 Pedals / Petals (2013, Vinyl Films)
 Catalin (2014)
 Wisdom for Debris (2014)

Compilations
 Indecipherable Text (2007, Sensory Projects, Australia)
Australian release combines 'Lambent Material' and 'Talk Amongst the Trees' and includes three additional tracks.
Life Through Bombardment (2009, Temporary Residence Limited)
Vinyl box set of full discography with Cooper's signature, poster, and artwork.
Life Through Bombardment Vol. 2 (2016, Temporary Residence Limited)
Vinyl box set of full discography with Cooper's signature, poster, and artwork. Includes a compilation album of rare and unreleased material titled Curious Things

Appears on
Pacific UV - Pacific UV EP (2006, WARM Records) (song: "L.A.P.D. vs N.Y.P.D. (Eluvium Remix)")
 Queer as Folk Season 5 Episode 9 end credits "Genius and the Thieves"
 Skins Season 2 Episode 8 (Jal) "Genius and the Thieves"
Various Artists - Thankful (2005, Temporary Residence Limited) (song: "Carousel")
Various Artists - Tempset - (Re)Mix Tape (2006, Temporary Residence Limited) (Eluvium appears on four tracks of a mash-up remix CD made for Temporary Residence Limited's 10th Anniversary Festival, September 2006)
Explosions in the Sky - All of a Sudden I Miss Everyone (2007, Temporary Residence Limited) (song: "So Long, Lonesome (Eluvium Mix)") (Matthew Cooper's mix of the album track appears on its bonus CD)
 Various Artists - Props Summer 2004 BMX Scene Report
 Various Artists - Destroy Independent Music! (2007, Temporary Residence Limited) (song: "Prelude For Time Feelers")
Britney Spears - DVD: For the Record (2008), FremantleMedia Enterprises (song: "Taken")
 Ireland's Grand Slam Glory 2009 (song: "Radio Ballet")
 The Sight Below - Murmur EP (2009, Ghostly International) (song: "No Place For Us (Eluvium Remix)")
 Balmorhea - All Is Wild, All Is Silent: Remixes (2009, Western Vinyl) (song: "Settler (Eluvium Remix)")
 The Black Heart Procession - Blood Bunny / Black Rabbit (2010, Temporary Residence Limited (song: "Drugs (Remix by Eluvium)")

as Matthew Robert Cooper
Studio albums
 Miniatures (2008, Gaarden Records)

Original soundtracks
 Some Days Are Better Than Others (2011, Temporary Residence Limited)

as Martin Eden
In 2012, Cooper began releasing electronic music under a new moniker, Martin Eden, named after the 1909 Jack London book. Cooper described the debut Martin Eden 7" as something that "may appeal to fans of early Aphex Twin stuff, or turn of the century electronic music."
Studio albums
 Dedicate Function (2012, Lefse Records)

Singles
 Lefse Records 7" (2012, Lefse Records)

as Concert Silence
Concert Silence is a collaborative project with Charles Buckingham that began in 2007
Studio albums09.22.07 [2-3pm] (2007, self-released on website / 2010, LP/CD, Infraction Records)

EPsRain Furniture E.P. (2010, 12" EP/CD, Infraction Records)

as MRC / PRB
MRC / PRB is a collaborative project with Peter Broderick that began in 2011
SinglesI Am Darkness, I Am Light (2011, lathe cut 5", Brian Records)

as Inventions
Inventions is a collaborative project with Mark T. Smith of Explosions in the Sky that began in 2013
Studio albumsInventions (Temporary Residence Limited, 2014)Maze of Woods (Temporary Residence Limited, 2015)

EPsRemixed (Temporary Residence Limited, 2015)Blanket Waves (Temporary Residence Limited, 2015)

SinglesSpringworlds'' (Temporary Residence Limited, 2015)

See also 
List of ambient music artists

References

External links 
 
 

Ambient musicians
Songwriters from Tennessee
Living people
Songwriters from Kentucky
Musicians from Louisville, Kentucky
Year of birth missing (living people)
Temporary Residence Limited artists